Jovaldir Ferreira known as Peris (born 9 January 1982) is a former Brazilian footballer who played left defender.

Career

Brazil career
Peris started his career in Moto Club de São Luís. He signed a 5-year contract in January 2005 with Americano (MA)., however he left for Santa Cruz in temporary deal. He played once in 2005 Copa do Brasil. In January 2006 the deal was renewed. In September 2006, he was signed by Bahia of Brazilian third division.

Cherno More
Peris came to Cherno More in summer 2007, together with his compatriots Djalma and Fabinho Recife. After a short try-out, the coach Nikola Spasov liked him, and he signed a three-year contract with the football club from Varna on 12 July 2007. Peris quickly became part of the main team. The Brazilian player is uncompromising in defence and very dangerous in attack. He stands out with fastness, good technique and precise passing. He has a strong kick and often shoots from long distances. Because of his qualities, shortly after he came to Bulgaria,  In A PFG the Brazilian player won the title of one of the best left backs.  In the matches against VfB Stuttgart for UEFA Cup in the 2008 campaign, he left excellent impressions in the football specialists with his good play and in the German press appeared information that VfB Stuttgart and VfL Bochum wanted the player in their teams.

Apollon Limassol
In summer 2009 he signed a 2-year contract with Apollon Limassol.

Achievements
Bulgarian Cup finalist with Cherno More Varna: 2008
Third place in Bulgaria with Cherno More Varna: 2009

References

External links
 
 Futpedia

1982 births
Living people
Brazilian footballers
First Professional Football League (Bulgaria) players
Cypriot First Division players
Moto Club de São Luís players
Santa Cruz Futebol Clube players
Esporte Clube Bahia players
PFC Cherno More Varna players
Apollon Limassol FC players
Brazilian expatriate footballers
Expatriate footballers in Bulgaria
Expatriate footballers in Cyprus
Brazilian expatriate sportspeople in Bulgaria
Sportspeople from Maranhão
Association football fullbacks